Ben Thuy is a trading port on the mouth of the Ca River in Vietnam. Ben Thuy is near the city of Vinh. The Ben Thuy Thermal Power Plant and Ben Thuy Port and Ferry were listed as targets in a telegram during the Vietnam War.

References
 Telegram From the Department of State to the Embassy in Vietnam, June 1, 1965

Ports and harbours of Vietnam
Buildings and structures in Nghệ An province
Geography of Nghệ An province